Aerolloyd Iguassú S.A., was a Brazilian airline founded in 1933. In 1939 it was sold to VASP.

History 
Aerolloyd Iguassú was founded in the beginning of 1933, in Curitiba, Brazil with initial financial support from the mate manufacturer Matte Leão. Initially two 3-passenger Klemm Kl 31A were bought and on July 20, 1933, flights between Curitiba and São Paulo started. In 1934, a second route to Joinville started and further extended to Florianópolis in 1935. That same year, three 5-seat Stinson Reliant arrived.

The airline faced serious technical difficulties related to the region where it operated – it is mountainous and subject to frequent weather changes, and to the lack of experienced pilots. Maintenance was also difficult because of lack of specialized mechanics. Finally on October 28, 1939, the airline was sold to VASP, which was particularly interested in the operational rights to fly from São Paulo southbound.

Destinations 
Aerolloyd Iguassú served the following locations:,

 Curitiba
 Florianópolis
 Itajaí
 Joinville
 São Paulo

Fleet

See also
List of defunct airlines of Brazil

References 

Defunct airlines of Brazil
Airlines established in 1933
Airlines disestablished in 1939
1933 establishments in Brazil